Polyxenidae is a family of millipedes in the order Polyxenida containing approximately 47 species in 19 genera. Adults in all species in this family have 13 pairs of legs.

Genera

 Allographis Silvestri 1948
 Anopsxenus Condé & Jacquemin 1963
 Chilexenus Silvestri 1948
 Eudigraphis Silvestri 1948
 Macroxenodes Silvestri 1948
 Macroxenus Brölemann 1917
 Mauritixenus Verhoeff 1939
 Mesoxenontus Silvestri 1948
 Miopsxenus Condé 1951
 Monographis Attems 1907
 Monoxenus Jones 1937
 Pauropsxenus Silvestri 1948 (Fossil species known from Burmese amber, Cenomanian)
 Pollyxenus Latreille 1802/1803
 Polyxenus Latzel 1884
 Propolyxenus Silvestri 1948
 Saroxenus Cook 1896
 Silvestrus Jones 1937
 Typhloxenus Condé 1955
 Unixenus Jones 1944
 †Electroxenus Nguyen Duy-Jacquemin and Azar 2004 Lebanese amber, Barremian
 †Libanoxenus Nguyen Duy-Jacquemin and Azar 2004 Lebanese amber, Barremian

See also 
Polyxenus fasciculatus

References

External links

Polyxenida
Millipede families